Mitsuharu (written: 光晴, 光春 or 光治) is a masculine Japanese given name. Notable people with the name include:

, Japanese samurai
, Japanese samurai and daimyō
, Imperial Japanese Army general 
, Imperial Japanese Navy admiral
, Japanese poet
, Japanese professional wrestler

Japanese masculine given names